The Barbarossa class was a class of ocean liners of North German Lloyd and the Hamburg America Line of the German Empire. Of the ten ships built between 1896 and 1902, six were built by AG Vulcan Stettin, three were built by Blohm & Voss, and one was built by Schichau-Werke; all were built in Germany. They averaged  and featured twin screw propellers driven by quadruple-expansion steam engines.

History

Early career
The class was intended to be called the Bremen class, but delays in the building of that ship caused the class to instead be named after Barbarossa. These first four ships were used on Australian, Far East, and North Atlantic routes for NDL. On Australian and Far East voyages, the liners transited the Suez Canal, and were, along with NDL's , the largest ships regularly using the canal. The size of these liners was a principal reason for the canal's deepening; Bremen, on one trip to Australia, became the first ship to transit the newly deepened canal.

The latter six ships, two for NDL and four for the Hamburg America Line (German: Hamburg-Amerikanische Packetfahrt-Aktien-Gesellschaft or HAPAG) were launched between June 1899 and November 1901. Beginning in 1904 they were mainly used on the Italy–New York route.

Displeased with the Far East service, HAPAG withdrew and transferred Hamburg to North Atlantic service and traded Kiautschou to NDL for five freighters in 1904. Kiautschou, renamed by NDL to Princess Alice, became the only Barbarossa-class ship to sail for both of the major German passenger lines. She stayed on the Far East mail route until 1914.

Moltke spent time on North Atlantic and Mediterranean routes; Blücher on North Atlantic and South American routes.

World War I
At the outbreak of World War I, rather than face capture or destruction at the hands of the British Royal Navy, most of the Barbarossa-class ships were interned in neutral ports. König Albert and Moltke were interned at Genoa, while Blücher was interned at Pernambuco, Brazil. Five ships were interned at U.S.-controlled ports: four—Barbarossa, Friedrich der Grosse, Prinzess Irene, and Hamburg—were interned at Hoboken, New Jersey, and Princess Alice was interned at Cebu, Philippine Islands. Only Königin Luise and Bremen were in German ports, where they remained throughout the war. In September 1914, Hamburg was briefly renamed and chartered to the American Red Cross. Sailing under the name Red Cross, she made one roundtrip voyage to Europe before returning to New York, and her previous name.

As Italy, the United States, and Brazil successively joined the war, each seized the interned Barbarossa ships (along with all other German and Austro-Hungarian ships) and renamed them. In Italy, Moltke became Pesaro, while König Albert became hospital ship Ferdinando Palasciano; in Brazil, Blücher became Leopoldina. The five ships interned under U.S. control all became United States Navy transport ships, and were renamed as follows:

 Barbarossa became USS Mercury (ID-3012)
 Friedrich der Grosse became USS Huron (ID-1408)
 Prinzess Irene became USS Pocahontas (ID-3044)
 Hamburg became USS Powhatan (ID-3013)
 Princess Alice became USS Princess Matoika (ID-2290)
These five ex-German transports carried over 95,000 American troops to France before the Armistice.

Postwar service 
At the conclusion of World War I, war reparations permanently assigned the eight seized ships to the nations that held them. Further, Königin Luise and Bremen, safely laid up in Germany during the war, were assigned to the UK. Apart from those two, only two other Barbarossa-class ships changed national registry after the war. Brazil sold Leopoldina (the ex-Blücher) to the French Compagnie Générale Transatlantique which operated her under the name Suffren. Pocahontas (the ex-Prinzess Irene) was laid up in Gibraltar after mechanical failures and was purchased by NDL in 1923. She became the only member of the Barbarossa class to resume sailing under the German flag. First renamed Bremen and later Karlsruhe (to free the name Bremen for a newer ship), she sailed primarily on the Bremen–New York route.

In 1922, City of Honolulu (the ex-Friedrich der Grosse), sailing on her first roundtrip on the Los Angeles–Honolulu route for the Los Angeles Steamship Company, caught fire and burned in a calm sea. No one on board was killed or injured when the lifeboats were launched, and when towing the burned hulk proved unsuccessful, the ship was sunk by gunfire from a United States Coast Guard Cutter; she was the only member of the Barbarossa class to sink. By the end of the 1920s, six more Barbarossa ships had met their ends at the hands of shipbreakers, and none of the remaining three ships would survive the next decade. All were scrapped by 1935, bringing an end to the career of the Barbarossa class.

Ships

Notes

References

Bibliography 

 
 
 
 
 

 Matthias L. Trennheuser: Die innenarchitektonische Ausstattung deutscher Passagierschiffe zwischen 1880 und 1940. Verlag H.M. Hauschild GmbH, Bremen, Bremen 2010, .

Ocean liner classes
Steamships of Germany
 
Ships of Norddeutscher Lloyd